Luis Caroz was the Imperial ambassador to the court of Henry VIII of England between 1509 and 1514. He represented Ferdinand of Aragon, the King's father-in-law as Henry's wife at the time was Catherine of Aragon.

References

Year of birth missing
Year of death missing
16th-century Spanish people
Ambassadors of Spain to England